Sameer Bandekar (born 29 October 1964) is an Indian cricket umpire who currently represents the United States. He stood in his first men's One Day International (ODI) match in 2002. He later emigrated to the United States, and was elected to the ICC Associates and Affiliates Umpire Panel in 2015. In May 2015, he stood in matches in the 2015 ICC Americas Twenty20 Division One tournament. He stood in his first men's Twenty20 International (T20I) on 22 December 2021, between United States and Ireland.

In January 2022, he was named as one of the on-field umpires for the 2022 ICC Under-19 Cricket World Cup in the West Indies.

See also
 List of One Day International cricket umpires

References

1964 births
Living people
Indian One Day International cricket umpires
Place of birth missing (living people)
American cricket umpires
Indian cricket umpires
Indian emigrants to the United States
American cricketers
American sportspeople of Indian descent